The Etolin Canoe is an unfinished dugout canoe on Etolin Island, in the Tongass National Forest, that is listed on the U.S. National Register of Historic Places.  It is made of a single Western red cedar or an Alaska yellow cedar trunk and was started, it is believed, somewhere between 1880 and 1920.  

The canoe was listed on the National Register of Historic Places in 1989.

See also
National Register of Historic Places listings in Wrangell, Alaska

References

Canoes
National Register of Historic Places in Wrangell, Alaska
Tongass National Forest